The Royal Borough of Kensington and Chelsea Parks Police is a body of constables responsible for policing the parks and open spaces of the London Borough of Kensington and Chelsea. In 2013, it was merged with the Hammersmith and Fulham Parks Constabulary to form the Parks Police Service. Then, in July 2019 The Royal Borough of Kensington and Chelsea Parks Police moved away from The London Borough of Hammersmith and Fulham Parks Constabulary, once again becoming a single service.

Organisation and Duties

The Royal Borough of Kensington and Chelsea Parks Police is part of the Community Safety Department and provides a uniformed body of constables across the twenty-five parks and open spaces in the Royal Borough of Kensington and Chelsea, to detect and deter crime.

Officers
The Parks Police consists of two Sergeants and nine Constables.

The two Sergeants report to the RBKC Council Senior Community Safety Officer.

Their specific duties include:

reporting crime within the parks
dealing with anti-social behaviour
detaining offenders
enforcing bye-laws and the dog control public spaces protection orders
security at park events
dog chipping and dog shows
attending park user group meetings
crime prevention
lost property in parks
truancy patrols.

Applicants considered to be Parks Police Constables are expected to have previous experience as an attested constable (regular officer or Special Constable) with a Home Office force, British Transport Police or the now disbanded Royal Parks Constabulary.

Powers
Members of the constabulary are sworn in as constables under article 18 of the Greater London Parks and Open Spaces Order 1967, meaning they have powers of a constable to deal with bye-laws relating to parks and open spaces under their control.

They are warranted constables providing a police service, and as such have powers of arrest, power to seize illicit drugs, and authority to carry police weapons (such as batons).

Arrests
In 2008, the constabulary made 30 arrests, mainly for possession of drugs, minor thefts and antisocial behaviour.

Uniform and Equipment
The Constables wear a typical British police uniform, which includes:

white shirt
black tie (male) or crevat (female)
dark blue or black trousers
black peaked cap with black and white chequered capband with RBKC Parks Police capbadge (male)
black bowler cap with black and white chequered capband with RBKC Parks Police capbadge (female)
black or dark blue trousers
black stab vest with RBKC Parks Police logo and wording
high-visibility jackets.

All constables have and wear a collar number when in uniform, which is on their epaulettes in operational dress.

Equipment
Park Police constables are warranted constables and therefore carry expandable batons, as well as handcuffs, radios, body worn video-cameras, incapacitant or defence spray  and other police equipment.

Parks Police use motor vehicles and pedal cycles to patrol, as well as carrying out usual foot patrols.

In 2021, the Parks Police introduced two new vehicles:

BMW Hybrid vehicle
Nissan Electric vehicle

both liveried with yellow-and-blue Battenburg markings and equipped with blue lights.

Ranks
There are two ranks within the RBKC Parks Police.

Relationship with other police
The parks are not a separate police area and as such are part of the Metropolitan Police District.  Therefore, the Metropolitan Police are ultimately statutorily responsible for policing the parks and the investigation of crime committed within them.  The RBKC Parks Police between 2013 and 2019 was merged with the Hammersmith and Fulham Parks Constabulary.

See also
Law enforcement in the United Kingdom
List of law enforcement agencies in the United Kingdom, Crown Dependencies and British Overseas Territories
Hammersmith and Fulham Parks Constabulary

References

External links
Royal Borough of Kensington and Chelsea Parks Police website

Royal Borough of Kensington and Chelsea
Police
Park police forces of London